Haunted Valley is a fifteen episode American adventure film serial starring Ruth Roland, in which Ruth Ranger, the president of an engineering firm engaged in a construction project at the Lost River Dam, takes out a three-month million-dollar loan from supposed friend Harry Mallinson with the "Haunted Valley" as collateral. It is unknown if the film currently survives.

Episodes

The serial consisted of fifteen episodes, released from May 6, 1923 to August 12, 1923.

Bound to the Enemy
Adventure in the Valley
Imperiled at Sea
Into the Earthquake Abyss
The Fight at Lost River Dam
The Brink of Eternity
The Midnight Raid
The Radio Trap
The Ordeal of Fire
The 100th Day
Called to Account
Double Peril
To Hazardous Height
In Desperate Flight
Disputed Treasure

Cast
Ruth Roland ... Ruth Ranger
Jack Dougherty ... Eugene Craig
Larry Steers ... Henry Mallinson
Eulalie Jensen ... Vivian Delamar
Aaron Edwards ... Denslow
William Ryno ... Weatherby
Francis Ford ... Sharkey
Edouard Trebaol... Dinny
Noble Johnson ...

Production

References

External links

1923 films
American silent serial films
Lost American films
1923 adventure films
American black-and-white films
American adventure films
1923 lost films
1920s American films
Silent adventure films